The Federal Agency for Youth Affairs (Rosmolodyozh) is a federal agency executive power in Russia, performing functions for the provision of public services and management of state property in the field of youth policy, implementation, in cooperation with public organizations and movements representing the interests of young people, activities aimed at ensuring a healthy lifestyle for young people, moral and patriotic education and the realization by young people of their professional opportunities.

It was formed in 2008 as an independent agency functioning as part of the government of Russia.

References

External links 
 Official website 

2008 establishments in Russia
Government agencies established in 2004
Government agencies of Russia